Springfield is a city in the U.S. state of Ohio and the county seat of Clark County. Springfield is home to Wittenberg University, a liberal arts college.

As of the 2020 census, the city had a total population of 58,662, The Springfield Metropolitan Statistical Area had a population of 136,001 residents. The Little Miami Scenic Trail, a paved rail-trail that is nearly 80 miles long, extends from the Buck Creek Scenic Trail head in Springfield south to Newtown, Ohio (near Cincinnati). It has become popular with hikers and cyclists.

In 1983, Newsweek magazine featured Springfield in its 50th-anniversary issue, entitled, "The American Dream." It chronicled the effects of changes of the previous 50 years on five local families. In 2004, Springfield was chosen as an "All-America City." In the 2010s, Springfield ranked low among cities in the state and nation for indicators such as health, happiness, and well-being.

History

Shawnee Native Americans
The historic Shawnee occupied this area before and during European exploration and settlement. They had the villages of Peckuwe and Piqua at 39° 54.5′ N, 83° 54.68′ W, and 39° 54.501′ N, 83° 54.682′ W, respectively. These were the settlements of the Peckuwe and Kispoko divisions of the Shawnee Tribe.

During the American Revolution and associated frontier wars, European Americans destroyed these villages in the Battle of Piqua, August 8, 1780. Logan's raid occurred near Springfield October 1786. European Americans later developed the city of Springfield, Ohio near here.

In the early 21st century, the Piqua Sept of the Ohio Shawnee Tribe placed a traditional sacred cedar pole in commemoration of the Peckuwe village site and their tribe. It is registered as a state historical marker. Today that site is within Springfield, located "on the southern edge of the George Rogers Clark Historical Park, in the lowlands in front of the park's 'Hertzler House'."

Early settlement
Springfield was founded in 1801 by European-American James Demint, a former teamster from Kentucky. It was named for historic Springfield, Massachusetts. When Clark County was created in 1818 from parts of Champaign, Madison, and Greene counties, Springfield was chosen by the legislature over the village of New Boston (another village named after a New England predecessor) as the county seat, winning by two votes.

Early growth in Springfield was stimulated by federal construction of the National Road into Ohio. Springfield was the terminus for approximately 10 years as politicians wrangled over its future path. Dayton and Eaton wanted the road to veer south after Springfield, but President Andrew Jackson, who took office in 1829, made the final decision to have the road continue straight west to Richmond, Indiana.

Industrial development
During the mid-and-late 19th century, industry began to flourish in Springfield. Industrialists included Oliver S. Kelly, Asa S. Bushnell, James Leffel, P. P. Mast, and Benjamin H. Warder. Bushnell also constructed the Bushnell Building, naming it after himself. Patent attorney to the Wright Brothers, Harry Aubrey Toulmin, Sr., wrote the 1904 patent here to cover their invention of the airplane. In 1894, The Kelly Springfield Tire Company was founded in the city.

P. P. Mast started Farm & Fireside magazine to promote the products of his agricultural equipment company. His publishing company, known as Mast, Crowell, and Kirkpatrick, eventually developed as the Crowell-Collier Publishing Company, best known for publishing Collier's Weekly.

At the turn of the 20th century, Springfield became known as the "Home City." It was a period of high activity by fraternal organizations, and such lodges as the Masonic Lodge, Knights of Pythias, and Odd Fellows built homes for orphans and aged members of their orders. Springfield also became known as "The Champion City," a reference to the Champion Farm Equipment brand, manufactured by the Warder, Bushnell & Glessner Company. In 1902 this company was absorbed into International Harvester. The latter operates today in Springfield as Navistar International, a manufacturer of medium to large trucks.

In 1902 A.B. Graham, then the superintendent of schools for Springfield Township in Clark County, established a "Boys' and Girls' Agricultural Club." Approximately 85 children from 10 to 15 years of age attended the first meeting on January 15, 1902, in Springfield, in the basement of the Clark County Courthouse. This was the start of what would soon be called the "4-H Club"; it expanded to become a nationwide organization, at a time when agriculture was a mainstay of the economy in many regions. (4-H stands for "Head, Heart, Hands, and Health"). The first projects included food preservation, gardening, and elementary agriculture. Today, the Courthouse still bears a large 4H symbol under the flag pole at the front of the building to commemorate its role in founding the organization. The Clark County Fair is the second-largest fair in the state (only the Ohio State Fair is larger), and the 4H has continued to be very popular in this area.

On March 7, 1904, over a thousand white residents formed a lynch mob, stormed the jail, and removed prisoner Richard Dixon, a black man accused of killing police officer Charles B. Collis. Dixon was shot to death and then hanged from a pole on the corner of Fountain and Main Street, where the mob shot his body numerous times. From there the mob rioted through the town, destroying and burning much of the black area. The events were covered by national newspapers and provoked outrage. In February 1906, another white mob formed and again burned the black section of town, known as "the levee", as it was located in the flood-prone area near the river. Sixty years later, Springfield was the first city in Ohio to elect a black mayor, Robert Henry.

On February 26, 1906, there was another riot, the result of an altercation between a white man and a black man. The proceeding violence burned down a significant portion of the black neighborhood in Springfield and left nearly a hundred people homeless.

The final riot took place in 1921, although relatively peaceful compared to the two prior. It was reported that there was in fact little to no rioting, and that other reports made by The New York Times of 14 people killed was in fact, incorrect.

From 1916 to 1926, 10 automobile companies operated in Springfield. Among them were the Bramwell, Brenning, Foos, Frayer-Miller, Kelly Steam, Russell-Springfield, and Westcott. The Westcott, known as "the car built to last," was a six-cylinder four-door sedan manufactured by Burton J. Westcott of the Westcott Motor Car Company.

Westcott and his wife Orpha are now even better known for having commissioned architect Frank Lloyd Wright in 1908 to design their home at 1340 East High Street. The Westcott House, a sprawling two-story stucco and concrete house, has all the features of Wright's "prairie style," including horizontal lines, low-pitched roof, and broad eaves. Wright became world-renowned, and this is his only prairie-style house in the state of Ohio. In 2000 the property was purchased by the Frank Lloyd Wright Building Conservancy (based in Chicago.) As part of a prearranged plan, the house was sold to a newly formed local Westcott House Foundation. This foundation managed an extensive 5-year, $5.8 million restoration, completed in October 2005. The landmark house is now open to the public for guided tours.
International Harvester (now Navistar International), a manufacturer of farm machinery and later trucks, became the leading local industry after 1856, when Springfield native William Whiteley invented the self-raking reaper and mower. International Harvester and Crowell-Collier Publishing were the major employers throughout most of the next century. Crowell-Collier closed its magazines in 1957 and sold its Springfield printing plant.

Late 20th century to present
The decline in manufacturing and other blue-collar industries in the United States in the late 20th and early 21st centuries resulted in significant economic and population losses in Springfield. A 27% decrease in median income between 1999 and 2014 was the largest of any metropolitan area in the country. Peaking at more than 82,000 in the 1960 census, the city population had declined to only 58,662 in 2020. Despite efforts by local politicians and business organizations, an economic recovery enjoyed by larger cities since the Great Recession has not included Springfield or other small cities in Ohio.

In recent years, Springfield has attempted revitalization of the downtown area with several projects to stimulate residential housing, attract heritage tourism, and benefit the local economy. In 2019, the city began development on 34 new townhomes in downtown along Center Street, which will be named Center Street Townes. The City of Springfield also voted to approve $3.3 million toward a new $7 million parking garage in downtown; it started construction in 2019. Since 2000, notable downtown improvements that have been finished include the Ohio Valley Surgical Hospital, Springfield Regional Medical Center, Mother Stewart's Brewing Company, the NTPRD Chiller Ice Arena, and the demolition of several decaying structures. These buildings include the Arcue Building, the Robertson Building, and the Crowell-Collier building.

New revitalization projects have not been limited to the downtown region, however. Efforts have been made to try and revitalize the Upper Valley Mall for years, mostly falling short as anchor tenants such as JCPenney, Macy's and Sears have closed and 40 acres of the property was purchased by the Clark County Land Reutilization Corp. for $3 million in mid-2018. The permanent closure of the mall was announced in 2021. Another major project for the city is the ongoing development of the Bridgewater neighborhood, which is the first significant housing development in the city of Springfield since the early 1990s. The construction project is estimated to bring over 230 new homes to the city. Utilities are currently being set up, and later in 2019, the roads will be paved. The development is estimated to take about four years to complete. Much of the new housing development is attributed to trying to attract new jobs into the area, which has apparently paid off. In recent years, Springfield has benefitted tremendously from Speedway LLC having success, Navistar International having a resurgence in recent years, and companies like TopreAmerica Corp. and Silfex being introduced into the community.

Geography
Springfield is located at  (39.927067, −83.804131).

The Clarence J. Brown Reservoir is located on the northeast outskirts of Springfield.

Demographics

As of the 2000 census, the median income for a household in the city was $32,193, and the median income for a family was $39,890. Males had a median income of $32,027 versus $23,155 for females. The per capita income for the city was $16,660. 16.9% of the population and 13.5% of families were below the poverty line. Out of the total population, 23.9% of those under the age of 18 and 9.6% of those 65 and older were living below the poverty line.

2010 census
As of the 2010 census, there were 60,608 people, 24,459 households, and 14,399 families residing in the city. The population density was 2,693.7 people per square mile (1,039.6/km2). There were 28,437 housing units at an average density of 1,263.9 per square mile (487.8/km2). The racial makeup of the city was 75.2% White, 18.1% African American, 0.3% Native American, 0.8% Asian, 0.02% Pacific Islander, and 4.0% from two or more races. Hispanic or Latino of any race were 3.0% of the population.

There were 24,459 households, of which 26.3% had children under the age of 18 living with them, 34.4% were married couples living together, 18.6% had a female householder with no spouse present, 5.9% had a male householder with no spouse present, and 41.1% were non-families. Of all households, 34.1% were made up of individuals, and 13.7% had someone living alone who was 65 years of age or older. The average household size was 2.38, and the average family size was 3.01.

In the population was spread out, with 24.4% under the age of 18, 11.5% from 18 to 24, 24.2% from 25 to 44, 24.6% from 45 to 64, and 15.3% who were 65 years of age or older. The median age was 36 years. For every 100 females, there were 90.9 males. For every 100 females age 18 and over, there were 86.2 males.

Crime
From 2012 through 2014, the city experienced a 21% increase in violent crime; from 618 per 100,000 persons to 750. Also during those years, occurrences of murder and non-negligent manslaughter steadily increased; from 5 to 7. In 2015, Springfield's violent crime reached a 14-year high, but this rate has since decreased.

Economy
Springfield has a notably weakened economy due to many factors, but a key cause for degradation of the economy in Springfield has been the decline in manufacturing jobs. Between 1999 and 2014, Springfield saw the median income decreased by 27 percent, compared to just 8 percent across the country. In the 1990s, Springfield lost 22,000 blue collar jobs, which was the backbone of the city economy. Today, Springfield largely relies on healthcare, manufacturing, transportation, leisure, education, financial institutions, and retail for employment.

Education
Springfield City Schools enroll 8,604 students in public primary and secondary schools. The district operates 16 public schools including ten elementary schools, three middle schools, one high school, and one alternative school.

Also located in Springfield is the Global Impact STEM Academy, an early-college middle school and high school certified in Science, Technology, Engineering, and Mathematics curriculum. It was founded in 2013.

Springfield is home to two institutions of higher learning, Wittenberg University, and Clark State College.

Wittenberg University is a Lutheran university that was founded in Springfield in 1845. It is a four-year private liberal arts university. It has approximately 1800 students and a faculty of approximately 140. It is situated on a campus of 114 acres. It is one of the most highly-rated liberal arts universities in the nation, offering more than seventy majors. Wittenberg has more than 150 campus organizations, which include ten national fraternities and sororities. The WUSO radio station is operated on the campus.

The city is also home to Clark State College. The Springfield and Clark County Technical Education Program opened in 1962 and began to offer technical training for residents of Springfield, Ohio, and surrounding communities. The charter for the organization of the Clark County Technical Institute was effective February 18, 1966. Clark County Technical Institute became Ohio’s first technical college to be sanctioned by the Ohio Board of Regents, the name changed from Clark County Technical Institute to Clark Technical College by action of the Ohio Board of Regents on February 17, 1972. The charter changed from Clark Technical College to Clark State Community College on June 17, 1988, and the college began offering Associate of Arts and Associate of Science transfer degrees that same year. With the addition of bachelor’s degrees now available at Clark State, the Board of Trustees has voted to change the name of the institution to encompass the advancements in educational opportunities made by the college. On January 1, 2021, Clark State Community College became known as Clark State College.

The Clark County Public Library operates three public libraries within the city of Springfield.

Media
The city is served by one daily newspaper, the Springfield News-Sun. The Wittenberg Torch is the newspaper of Wittenberg University, and WUSO-FM "The Berg" is its radio station. WEEC-FM radio, featuring Christian-based programming, is also located in the city.

Transportation
Ohio State Route 72 runs north-south through downtown Springfield. U.S. Highway 40 runs east-west through the downtown. U.S. Highway 68 runs north-south on the west edge of the city. Interstate 70 runs east-west to the south of the city.

Springfield–Beckley Municipal Airport, a civil-military airport, is 6.6 miles south of Springfield, between US 68 and Ohio Route 72. The closest airport with commercial passenger flights is Dayton International Airport, 27.2 miles to the west.
 
Springfield had been served by passenger railroads of the New York Central at its Big Four Depot, with trains for Cincinnati, Detroit, Cleveland and New York City, demolished in 1969, and the Pennsylvania Railroad at its station, with a train due for Richmond, Indiana and Chicago. The last train from Springfield, an unnamed remnant of the New York Central's Ohio State Limited, running on the (Cincinnati - Columbus - Cleveland) route by the Penn Central, had its final trip on April 30, 1971.

Notable people

The following are notable people born and/or raised in Springfield:

Mike DeWine – 70th and current Governor of Ohio
Berenice Abbott – photographer
Randy Ayers – former basketball head coach of Ohio State and the Philadelphia 76ers
Minnie Willis Baines Miller – author
Leslie Greene Bowman – president of the Thomas Jefferson Foundation; born in Springfield 
Edward Lyon Buchwalter – first president of the Citizens National Bank of Springfield, Ohio, U.S. Civil War captain.
Dave Burba – major league baseball player
William R. Burnett – novelist and screenwriter
Ron Burton – professional football player
Garvin Bushell – musician (saxophone, clarinet, etc.)
Butch Carter – NBA player and coach
Justin Chambers – actor (Alex Karev, Grey's Anatomy) and former model 
Call Cobbs, Jr. – jazz pianist
Jason Collier – professional basketball player
Trey DePriest – former linebacker of the Baltimore Ravens, 2 time NCAA National Champion of the Alabama Crimson Tide football team.
Marsha Dietlein – actress
Adam Eaton – major league baseball player
Wayne Embry – professional basketball player
Dorothy Gish – actress from the silent film era and after; younger sister of Lillian
Lillian Gish – actress from the silent film era and after
Luther Alexander Gotwald – tried for and acquitted of Lutheran heresy at Wittenberg College in 1893
Albert Belmont Graham – founder of 4-H
Anais Granofsky – (born in Springfield in 1973) is a Canadian actress, screenwriter, producer and director
Harvey Haddix – major league baseball player
Robert C. Henry – first African American mayor in Ohio
Dustin Hermanson – major league baseball player
Dave Hobson – former U.S. Congressman for Ohio's Seventh District
Alice Hohlmayer – All-American Girls Professional Baseball League player
Griffin House – singer-songwriter
Quentin Jackson – jazz trombonist
Jimmy Journell – major league baseball player
Taito Kantonen – academic and theologian
J. Warren Keifer – Civil War general and Speaker of the House
Bradley Kincaid – America's first country music star. He performed on WLS, WBZ, and WLW.
David Ward King – inventor of the King road drag
Brooks Lawrence – major league baseball player
John Legend – singer, musician, R&B and neo-soul pianist
Lois Lenski – author and illustrator of children's fiction, including Strawberry Girl
Deborah Loewer – U.S. Navy flag officer
Luke Lucas – major league baseball player
Johnny Lytle – jazz musician
John Mahoney – Ohio state senator
Will McEnaney – major league baseball player, pitcher for the Cincinnati Reds
Jeff Meckstroth – multiple world champion bridge player
Braxton Miller – Ohio State quarterback and NFL player
Davey Moore – boxer, World Featherweight Title holder 1959–1963
Troy Perkins – professional soccer player
Carl Ferdinand Pfeifer – presidential aide
Coles Phillips – early 20th-century illustrator, inventor of the "fade-away" girl
Robert Bruce Raup – professor, Teachers College, Columbia University, writer, and critic of American Education system.
Alaina Reed Hall – television actress, 227 and Sesame Street
Barbara Schantz – police officer, gained national attention for Playboy pictorial, and subject of the 1983 movie Policewoman Centerfold 
Cecil Scott – jazz clarinetist, tenor saxophonist, and bandleader
Dick Shatto – professional Canadian football player
Winant Sidle – U.S. Army major general
Elle Smith – model, journalist, and Miss USA 2021
James Garfield Stewart – Supreme Court of Ohio the 109th justice
Dann Stupp – author
Charles Thompson – jazz musician
Tommy Tucker (a.k.a. Robert Higginbotham) – jazz musician
Chris Via – professional bowler on the PBA Tour, winner of the 2021 U.S. Open
Crista Nicole Wagner – Playboy Playmate (May 2001) and Miss Hawaiian Tropic (2001)
Christopher J. Waild – screenwriter
Helen Bosart Morgan Wagstaff - artist
James R. Ward - World War II Medal of Honor recipient was born in Springfield.
Earle Warren – jazz saxophonist with Count Basie
Walter L. Weaver – U.S. Representative from Ohio
Rick White – major league baseball player
Worthington Whittredge – Hudson River School painter
Jonathan Winters – actor and comedian
J. T. Brubaker Baseball Player

See also
Clark County Heritage Center, which houses the Clark County Historical Society museum, library, and archives.
Springfield City School District, the school district that serves the city of Springfield

References

External links

 City of Springfield
 Greater Springfield Convention and Visitor's Bureau
 

 
Cities in Ohio
Populated places established in 1801
Cities in Clark County, Ohio
County seats in Ohio
National Road
1801 establishments in the Northwest Territory